One Radio (stylized as ONE Radio, previously known as Super One Radio) is a radio station in Malta owned by One Productions, the media arm of the Labour Party.

Address: A28B, Industrial Estate Marsa, MRS 3000 Malta.

ONE Radio
Started operations in 1990
Temporary transmissions started in May 1991
First transmission in August 1991
24-hour transmission started in November 1991

References

External links 
 

Radio stations in Malta
Labour Party (Malta) publications
Radio stations established in 1991